Syzygiella is a genus of liverworts belonging to the family Jungermanniaceae.

Species
As accepted by GBIF;

 Syzygiella acinacifolia (Hook. f. & Taylor) K.Feldberg, Váňa, Hentschel & J.Heinrichs 
 Syzygiella anomala (Lindenb. & Gottsche) Stephani
 Syzygiella apiculata 
 Syzygiella autumnalis 
 Syzygiella bilobata 
 Syzygiella boliviana 
 Syzygiella burghardtii 
 Syzygiella campanulata 
 Syzygiella ciliata 
 Syzygiella colombiana 
 Syzygiella colorata 
 Syzygiella concreta 
 Syzygiella contigua 
 Syzygiella eatonii 
 Syzygiella elongella 
 Syzygiella grandiflora 
 Syzygiella grollei 
 Syzygiella herzogiana 
 Syzygiella herzogii 
 Syzygiella inouei 
 Syzygiella jacquinotii 
 Syzygiella kerguelensis 
 Syzygiella macrocalyx 
 Syzygiella manca 
 Syzygiella mucronata 
 Syzygiella nigrescens 
 Syzygiella nipponica 
 Syzygiella nuda 
 Syzygiella oenops 
 Syzygiella oppositifolia 
 Syzygiella ovalifolia 
 Syzygiella paludosa 
 Syzygiella pectiniformis }
 Syzygiella perfoliata 
 Syzygiella plagiochiloides 
 Syzygiella pseudocclusa 
 Syzygiella purpurascens 
 Syzygiella quelkii 
 Syzygiella renifolia 
 Syzygiella riclefii 
 Syzygiella rubricaulis 
 Syzygiella securifolia 
 Syzygiella setulosa 
 Syzygiella sonderi 
 Syzygiella spegazziniana 
 Syzygiella subintegerrima 
 Syzygiella subundulata 
 Syzygiella tasmanica 
 Syzygiella teres 
 Syzygiella tonduzana 
 Syzygiella trigonifolia 
 Syzygiella uleana 
 Syzygiella undata 
 Syzygiella variabilis 
 Syzygiella variegata 
 Syzygiella virescens

References

Jungermanniales
Jungermanniales genera